Marcus Caecilius Metellus may refer to:

 Marcus Caecilius Metellus (praetor 206 BC)
 Marcus Caecilius Metellus (consul 115 BC)
 Marcus Caecilius Metellus (praetor 69 BC)